In physics, a sign convention is a choice of the physical significance of signs (plus or minus) for a set of quantities, in a case where the choice of sign is arbitrary. "Arbitrary" here means that the same physical system can be correctly described using different choices for the signs, as long as one set of definitions is used consistently. The choices made may differ between authors. Disagreement about sign conventions is a frequent source of confusion, frustration, misunderstandings, and even outright errors in scientific work. In general, a sign convention is a special case of a choice of coordinate system  for the case of one dimension.

Sometimes, the term "sign convention" is used more broadly to include factors of i and 2π, rather than just choices of sign.

Relativity

Metric signature
(Note that throughout this article we are displaying the signs of the eigenvalues of the metric in the order that presents the timelike component first, followed by the spacelike components). A choice of signature is associated with a variety of names:

:
Timelike convention
Particle physics convention
West coast convention
Mostly minuses
Landau–Lifshitz sign convention.

:
Spacelike convention
Relativity convention
East coast convention
Mostly pluses
Pauli convention

Cataloged below are the choices of various authors of some graduate textbooks:

:
Landau & Lifshitz
Gravitation: an introduction to current research (L. Witten)
 Ray D'Inverno, Introducing Einstein's relativity.

:
Misner, Thorne and Wheeler
Spacetime and Geometry: An Introduction to General Relativity
General Relativity (Wald) (Note that Wald changes signature to the timelike convention for Chapter 13 only.)

The signature  corresponds to the metric tensor:

and gives  as the relationship between mass and four momentum

whereas the signature  corresponds to:

and gives .

Curvature
The Ricci tensor is defined as the contraction of the Riemann tensor. Some authors use the contraction , whereas others use the alternative . Due to the symmetries of the Riemann tensor, these two definitions differ by a minus sign.

The sign of the Ricci tensor does not change, because the two sign conventions concern the sign of the Riemann tensor. The second definition just compensates the sign, and it works together with the second definition of the Riemann tensor (see e.g. Barrett O'Neill's Semi-riemannian geometry).

Other sign conventions 

 The sign choice for time in frames of reference and proper time: + for future and − for past is universally accepted.
 The sign of the electric charge, field strength tensor  in gauge theories and classical electrodynamics.
 Time dependence of a positive-frequency wave (see, e.g., the electromagnetic wave equation):
  (mainly used by physicists)
  (mainly used by engineers)
 The sign for the imaginary part of permittivity (in fact dictated by the choice of sign for time-dependence).
 The signs of distances and radii of curvature of optical surfaces in optics.
 The sign of work in the first law of thermodynamics.
 The sign of the weight of a tensor density, such as the weight of the determinant of the covariant metric tensor.
 The active and passive sign convention of current, voltage and power in electrical engineering.

It is often considered good form to state explicitly which sign convention is to be used at the beginning of each book or article.
The sign of spherical mirrors are also represented by sign convention

See also 
 Orientation (vector space), also known as "handedness"
 Symmetry (physics)
 Gauge theory

References

 

Mathematical physics